Hamilton Airport  is located  north of Hamilton, Victoria, Australia. Sharp Airlines was established at the airport and despite cancelling scheduled service in December 2014, retains a flying school at Hamilton. The airport is also home to the Hamilton Aero Club. The airport is operated by the Southern Grampians Shire Council.

The terminal, called the Sir RM Ansett Terminal, is named after Reginald Myles Ansett, who founded Ansett Airways at Hamilton in 1936. The Ansett Transport Museum is housed in the company's first aircraft hangar.

During World War II, the airport was home to the Royal Australian Air Force Armament School until 1943, when it relocated to Nhill.

See also
 List of airports in Victoria

References

Airports in Victoria (Australia)